The Sculptor Dwarf Irregular Galaxy (SDIG) is an irregular galaxy in the constellation Sculptor. It is a member of the NGC 7793 subgroup of the Sculptor Group. The galaxy was discovered in 1976.


Nearby galaxies and galaxy group information

The Sculptor Dwarf Irregular Galaxy and the dwarf galaxy UGCA 442 are both companions of the spiral galaxy NGC 7793.  These galaxies all lie within the Sculptor Group, a weakly bound, filament-like group of galaxies located near the Local Group.

See also
 Sculptor Dwarf Galaxy – a dwarf spheroidal or elliptical galaxy, also in Sculptor, but significantly closer; a satellite of the Milky Way.

References

External links

Dwarf irregular galaxies
Sculptor Group
Sculptor (constellation)
00621
349-31